, born June 22, 1978, in Yamatotakada, Nara is a Japanese anime filmmaker, screenwriter, and producer.  He is known for directing the critically successful 2013 film Possessions for which Morita was nominated for the Academy Award for Best Animated Short Film, as well as the popular 2014 anime franchise Tokyo Ghoul for its first and second seasons.

Notable works

TV productions

Valvrave the Liberator (2013; Storyboard (Ep. 5) 
Gatchaman Crowds (2013; CGI Director)
Tokyo Ghoul (2014; Director)
Tokyo Ghoul √A (2015; Director)

OVA
Freedom (2006; Director, CG, Storyboard (Ep. 4)
Coicent (2010, Director, Script)
Votoms Finder (2010; CG supervision)
Chō Kidō Gaiku KASHIWA-NO-HA (2015; Director, Supervisor manga adaptation)

Films
Kakurenbo: Hide & Seek (2005; Director, Scenario, Storyboard, Original story, Producer, CG, Editing)
A Farewell to Arms (2013; Unit Director)
Possessions (2013, Director, Screenplay)

References

External links
 

1978 births
Sunrise (company) people
Anime directors
Japanese film directors
Living people
People from Nara Prefecture
Writers from Nara Prefecture